Gamston is a ward, civil parish and a suburb of West Bridgford, in the Rushcliffe district of Nottinghamshire, England. The population of the civil parish at the 2011 census was 2,164.

The parish of Gamston comes under Holme Pierrepont and Gamston Parish Council. Gamston is split into Gamston North and Gamston South wards of Rushcliffe Borough Council; Gamston North includes Holme Pierrepont And Gamston Parish Council and the current Councillor is Jonathan Wheeler. Gamston South runs from Morrisons down to Edwalton. The parish and also contains the parish of Holme Pierrepont and the village of Edwalton. The population of this ward also taken at the 2011 Census was 5,337. It is one of the nine wards in West Bridgford.

Most of the homes in Gamston were built since the 1980s as part of the expansion of West Bridgford. The homes range from 2 bed bungalows and one bed terraces to 5 bedroomed family homes.

The border between Gamston and Edwalton exists at the junction of Beckside, Melton Gardens and Alford Road.  The West Bridgford border however is somewhat harder to ascertain, although the Grantham Canal provides a partial boundary in the North-West. The more recent housing estate off of Stavely Way, is however in West Bridgford.

Pubs in the area include 'The Goose' and 'The Gamston Lock'.

The modern centre of Gamston is based around Morrisons superstore, once Safeway; which now has a Chinese takeaway, vet surgery and pet store nearby, next to the community hall.

Local secondary schools and colleges include Rushcliffe School, West Bridgford Comprehensive and Central College Nottingham, although none of these are located in Gamston. Local primary schools include Pierrepont Gamston School, Edwalton Primary School in Edwalton and Abbey Road Primary School in West Bridgford.

In 2009, Gamston was proposed as the site for a 45,000 seat football stadium, to host games in the 2018 World Cup and Nottingham Forest football club, who have played at the City Ground in West Bridgford since 1898. Previous suggested sites included nearby Holme Pierrepont.

Population:
 1801 – 97
 1851 – 124
 1901 – 96

Transport-bus
5: Nottingham – West Bridgford – Gamston (Beckside Morrisons)
7: Nottingham – West Bridgford – Gamston (Beckside Morrisons)
L2 Locallink: Silverdale – Clifton – West Bridgford – Gamston (Ambleside)
822 Yourbus: West Bridgford – Gamston (Ambleside) - Cotgrave - Cropwell Bishop - Bingham

Facilities
Gamston has a school named Pierrepont Gamston Primary School which has been active since 2001.
Gamston has a Morrisons in the centre between Beckside and Ambleside.
It also has restaurants/pubs: "The Goose at Gamston" which is opposite Morrisons and "The Gamston Lock" which is on the edge of Gamston, prior to being rebuilt due to a large fire on 7 December 2013, the pub was called "The Bridge at Gamston".
Gamston has small facilities in the same area: Paper Moon Nursery, Vets4Pets shop, a town hall etc.
It has a small park on Ambleside.
Gamston has many paths by Grantham Canal to walk on.
Gamston has a Hospital named Lings Bar Hospital, which is a small Hospital with three elderly rehab wards, a dialysis unit and a community hospital.

Gamston is close to:
Edwalton
West Bridgford
Radcliffe
Cotgrave
Keyworth
Nottingham

Future developments

There are plans to make 4,000 homes to the east of Gamston with a retail park linked to that. This plan was passed by Rushcliffe Borough Council, as part of their obligation to meet housing targets. Work has yet to start.

References

External links 
Holme Pierrepont & Gamston Parish Council website

Churches:
St. Lukes – Church of England (West Bridgford)

Villages in Nottinghamshire
West Bridgford
Rushcliffe